Francisco Gomes Teixeira (28 January 1851, São Cosmado, Armamar – 8 February 1933, Porto) was a Portuguese mathematician and historian of mathematics.

Biography

In 1876 he became a corresponding member of the Academia Real das Ciências de Lisboa.

He published over 140 articles in prestigious international scientific journals. Before the year 1890 most of his publications were on mathematical analysis but from 1890 onwards most were on geometry.
He was named the third astronomer of the Observatório Astronómico de Lisboa in 1878, but only held this positions for about four months before returning to the University of Coimbra.

He was elected a parliamentary deputy by the Partido Regenerador in 1879 and participated in sessions of Parliament for that year and also in 1883 and 1884. In November 1879 he was put in charge of the University of Coimbra's chair of mathematical analysis and in February 1880 was formally appointed to this professorial chair.

In 1884 Gomes Teixeira was appointed to the chair of differential and integral calculus of the Academia Politécnica do Porto. In 1905 the Jornal de Sciencias Mathematicas e Astronomicas (founded by Gomes in 1877) was integrated into the newly created Anais Scientificos da Academia Politécnica do Porto.

His Tratado de las Curvas Especiales Notables won an award in 1899 from the Spanish Royal Academy of Sciences. A 3-volume French translation (with additions) was published in 1908 and 1909 as Traité des Courbes Spéciales Remarquables Planes et Gauches. He received in 1917 the prix Binoux d'histoire des sciences from the French Academy of Sciences.

Gomes Teixeira received honorary doctorates from the University of Madrid and the University of Toulouse. In 1911 at the newly formed University of Porto he became the first rector, retiring in 1917.

His body is entombed in the Igreja Matriz de São Cosmado. The tomb consists of a granite sarcophagus with the following inscription:
SERAPHICO FRANCISCO ASSISIENSI
atque
DIVO ANTONIO OLYSIPPONENSI
hoc monumentum erexit
FRANCISCUS GOMES TEIXEIRA
qui hi jacet.
(Divo Antonio is Latin for St. Anthony. Olissipóna was the ancient name for Lisbon. Gomes Teixeira wrote a 1931 book Santo António de Lisboa (história, tradição e lenda) and a 1926 book Santuários de montahna (impressões de viagens.)

Eponymous tributes

Praça de Gomes Teixeira (Gomes Teixeira Square), Porto
Rua Professor Doutor Francisco Gomes Teixeira, Porto
Rua Professor Doutor Francisco Gomes Teixeira em Carnaxide, Oeiras
Rua Francisco Gomes Teixeira em Setúbal, Setúbal
Sala Gomes Teixeira: Piso 4 Edifíco da Reitoria da Universidade do Porto
Agrupamento de Escolas Gomes Teixeira-Praça da Galiza, 4150-344 Porto
Escola básica dos 2.º e 3.º ciclos Gomes Teixeira - Armamar
approximate location of the statue of Dr. Gomes Teixeira in the village of São Cosmado from Google Street View

Selected publications

; ; . translated into French from the Spanish version but with revisions and extensive additions. Re-published in the Obras sobre Matemática, volumes IV, V et VII, 1908–1915; Chelsea Publishing Co, New York, 1971; Éditions Jacques Gabay, Paris, 1995.
, vol. I, 1904; vol. II, 1906; vol. III, 1906; vol. IV, 1908; vol. V, 1909; vol. VI, 1912; vol. VII, 1915.

References

External links
Gomes Teixeira (1851-1933), Fernando Reis
Ciência em Portugal: Personagens e Episódios
Matemático por acaso
História das matemáticas em Portugal
Francisco Gomes Teixeira
A concóide de Sluse
Francisco Gomes Teixeira. In Infopédia (Em linha).Porto: Porto Editora, 2003-2010.(Consult. 2010-05-09)
Francisco Gomes Teixeira, Reitor da Universidade do Porto

1851 births
1933 deaths
People from Viseu District
19th-century mathematicians
20th-century Portuguese mathematicians
Historians of mathematics
University of Coimbra alumni
Academic staff of the University of Coimbra
Academic staff of the University of Porto